The 47th Telluride Film Festival was scheduled to take place on September 4–7, 2020. In May 2020, it was announce that the festival would kick off a day earlier on September 3 for safety purposes. However, due to the COVID-19 pandemic in Colorado, the festival announced its cancellation on July 14, 2020. Telluride was due to honor the Silver Medallion to Chloé Zhao, Anthony Hopkins, and Kate Winslet.

Telluride announced the year's initial line-up on August 3, 2020. Ammonite and Concrete Cowboy were set to world premiere at the festival, but the two films were screened for the first time at the 2020 Toronto International Film Festival instead. Nomadland was also set to premiere at the festival, but it premiered at the 2020 Venice Film Festival. Telluride held a drive-in screening of the film at the Rose Bowl in Los Angeles.

Official selections
These films were set to screen at the festival before its cancellation.

Main programme

Long Shorts

Student Prints
The selection was curated and introduced by Gregory Nava. It selected the best student-produced work around the world.

Great Expectations
The selection was curated by Barry Jenkins.

Calling Cards
The selection was curated by Barry Jenkins.

Silver Medallion
Chloé Zhao
Anthony Hopkins
Kate Winslet

Notes

References

External links
 

2020 film festivals
2020 in Colorado
Festivals cancelled due to the COVID-19 pandemic
Impact of the COVID-19 pandemic on cinema
47th